JFL may refer to:

 CJFL-FM, a defunct radio station licensed to  Iroquois Falls, Ontario, Canada
 Japan Football League (1992–1998), the former second division of football (soccer) in Japan
 Japan Football League, the current fourth division of football in Japan
 Japan FM League. a commercial radio network
Japanese as a foreign language
 John Francis Leader, Irish psychologist and cognitive scientist
 Just Follow Law, a Singaporean film
 Just for Laughs, a comedy festival in Montreal, Quebec, Canada
 Just for Laughs (British TV series)
 WJFL, a radio station licensed to Tennille, Georgia, United States